Celebrity Dog School was a short-lived Australian reality series which aired on Network Ten. It was based on the original version aired in the UK. The show was hosted by Larry Emdur, who also hosted The Price is Right on the Nine Network, and Wheel of Fortune on the Seven Network. It was a Pett Productions format for BBC Worldwide, produced by Freehand Group Pty Limited.

The show involved six celebrities and their dogs given an obedience task, an agility task, and they must train them throughout the week. At the end of the week, they would perform these tasks in front of the other celebrities and the expert judges.

Home viewers had the option to vote for their favourite celebrity and dog pair via text message, with proceeds from each vote going to the RSPCA.

Towards the end of the series, there was to be a 'Grand Final Best in Show Spectacular' where they were to perform in front of a live audience. The most popular couple who was not eliminated would have won the 'Best in Series'. Bootsie scored a perfect score from all three judges; sadly, no such thing happened. After only three episodes, Network Ten placed the show in 'hiatus', and it ended up never returning.

Celebrities
The six celebrities in the show included:

Kim Watkins - Co-host of 9am with David and Kim and host of Saving Babies, which both aired on Network Ten
Robert 'Dipper' DiPierdomenico - AFL legend
Ajay Rochester - Host of The Biggest Loser, which also aired on Network Ten
Adam Richard - Comedian
Michael Bevan - Ex Australian Cricketer
Bianca Dye - Nova 96.9 radio host

Expert Judges
The expert judges on Celebrity Dog School were Steve Austin, who is Australia's premier dog trainer, and Dr Julie Summerfield, who is a qualified veterinarian and is currently the resident vet in the program 9am with David and Kim.

See also
 Pooch Perfect

References

External links 
 

Network 10 original programming
2000s Australian reality television series
Television shows about dogs
2007 Australian television series debuts
2007 Australian television series endings
Australian television series based on British television series